Anticheta is a genus of flies in the family Sciomyzidae, the marsh flies or snail-killing flies.

Species
Subgenus Anticheta Haliday, 1839
A. analis (Meigen, 1830)
A. atriseta (Loew, 1849)
A. borealis Foote, 1961)
A. brevipennis (Zetterstedt, 1846)
A. canadensis (Curran, 1923)
A. fulva Steyskal, 1960
A. johnsoni (Cresson, 1920)
A. melanosoma Melander, 1920
A. nigra Karl, 1921
A. obliviosa Enderlein, 1939
A. robiginosa Melander, 1920
A. shatalkini Vikhrev, 2008
A. testacea Melander, 1920
A. vernalis Fisher & Orth, 1971
Subgenus Paranticheta Enderlein, 1936
A. bisetosa Hendel, 1902

References

Sciomyzidae
Taxa named by Camillo Rondani
Sciomyzoidea genera